The Four Horsemen is the third studio album by American hip hop group Ultramagnetic MCs. It was released on August 10, 1993 via Wild Pitch Records. Audio production was handled by Ultramagnetic MCs, except for four tracks produced by Godfather Don, who helped to incorporate a darker, jazzier sound than the group's previous work. "Checkin' My Style" and "See the Man on the Street" were originally recorded in 1992 during Godfather Don-produced sessions for a projected solo album for Kool Keith's alias Rhythm X. Those same sessions also produced songs released on Cenobites LP, the CD edition of which contains the original extended version of "Checkin' My Style," retitled "Return To Zero." The Four Horsemen includes recurring science fiction and baseball themes and was viewed by fans as a welcome return to the group's hardcore roots. Because of a manufacturing error, the current Fontana Distribution pressing is identified as the U.M.C.'s on the covering sticker under the shrink wrap. The album peaked at number 55 on the Top R&B/Hip-Hop Albums and number 15 on the Heatseekers Albums.

Track listing

Personnel
Maurice Russell Smith – main artist, drums, keyboards, scratches, producer
Cedric Ulmont Miller – main artist, alto-saxophone, engineer, producer
Trevor Randolph – main artist, piano, percussion, producer
Keith Matthew Thornton – main artist, bass, producer
Rodney Chapman – featured artist (track 4), engineer, producer (tracks: 2, 4, 5, 8)
William "Spaceman" Patterson – guitar, bass, Rhodes piano 
Bruce Purse – horns & saxophone 
Ross Schneider – harmonica
Charles Lewis – keyboards
Gary Clugston – engineer
Lisle Leete – engineer
Chris Gehringer – mastering
David Norton – photography
Terry Clarke – design
Amy Fine – art direction

References

External links

1993 albums
Ultramagnetic MCs albums
Wild Pitch Records albums
Albums produced by Godfather Don